"Don't Cheat in Our Hometown" is a song written by Ray Pennington and Roy E. Marcum, and recorded by American country music artist Ricky Skaggs.  It was released in November 1983 as the first single and title track from the album Don't Cheat in Our Hometown.  The song was Skaggs' sixth #1 country hit.  The single went to #1 for one week and spent a total of 12 weeks on the country chart.

Chart performance

References

1983 singles
Ricky Skaggs songs
Songs written by Ray Pennington
Song recordings produced by Ricky Skaggs
Epic Records singles
1983 songs